Eva Lund (born 1 May 1971) is a Swedish curler. , .

Born in Stockholm, Sweden, as Eva Eriksson, she lives in Upplands Väsby, Stockholm, with her husband and Swedish national curling coach Stefan Lund and her son Adam and daughter Anna . Eva Lund trains with the Härnösands CK club, and when not curling is a regulatory affairs project manager.

Eva Lund played third for Anette Norberg's team, and has won many international titles, including two golds in the Olympic Winter Games 2006 in Turin and 2010 in Vancouver. In the world championships she has a gold from 2005 and 2006, a silver from 2001 and a bronze from 2003. She has won gold in the European championships in 2001, 2003, 2004, 2005 and 2007. She also has a gold from 1993 as a reserve. And in the Elite series she has won gold in 2001, 2003, 2004, 2005 and 2006, with bronze from 1993, 1998, and 1999. She recently retired.

In 2003 she was inducted into the Swedish Curling Hall of Fame.

References

External links
 
 
 Music video of Swedish women's curling team with Swedish metal band Hammerfall

Living people
1971 births
People from Upplands Väsby Municipality
Curlers at the 2006 Winter Olympics
Swedish female curlers
Olympic curlers of Sweden
Olympic gold medalists for Sweden
Curlers at the 2010 Winter Olympics
Olympic medalists in curling
Medalists at the 2010 Winter Olympics
Medalists at the 2006 Winter Olympics
World curling champions
European curling champions
Swedish curling champions
Continental Cup of Curling participants